was a Japanese entomologist.

Publications
Kato, M. 1925. Japanese Cicadidae, with descriptions of new species. Natural History Society of Formosa 15:1-47
Kato, M. 1925. Japanese Cicadidae, with descriptions of some new species and genera. Transactions of the Natural History Society of Formosa 15:55-76
Kato, M. 1926. Japanese Cicadidae, with descriptions of four new species. Transactions of the Natural History Society of Formosa 16:171-176
Kato, M. 1930. Two new butterflies from Japan and Formosa. Zephyrus 2(4):206-208, 1 fig.
Kato, M. 1961. Fauna Japonica Vol. 3: Cicadidae (Insecta). Biogeographical Society of Japan, Tokyo

References

External links
Semigaku, Masayo Kato exhibition at The University Museum, The University of Tokyo

1898 births
1967 deaths
Japanese entomologists
20th-century Japanese zoologists